Michiel Schapers (born 11 October 1959) is a former tennis player from the Netherlands.

Tennis career
Turning professional in 1982, Schapers represented his native country at the 1988 Summer Olympics in Seoul, where he was defeated in quarterfinals by eventual winner Miloslav Mečíř of Czechoslovakia.

In 1987 at Wimbledon, he was the only player to take a set against eventual champion Pat Cash in their third-round match. His most famous victory was over reigning Wimbledon champion Boris Becker in the second round of the 1985 Australian Open. Schapers went on to reach the quarterfinals, his best singles result at a Grand Slam, and later equaled that result at the 1988 Australian Open. In 1988, he reached the final of the mixed-doubles draw at the French Open together with Brenda Schultz-McCarthy in which they lost to Lori McNeil and Jorge Lozano.

Schapers reached his highest singles ATP-ranking on 25 April 1988 when he became world No. 25. After his playing career, he became a coach. From 1998 until 2000, he was the captain of the Dutch Davis Cup team.

Career finals

Singles (0–4)

Doubles (3–6)

External links
 
 
 

1959 births
Dutch male tennis players
Hopman Cup competitors
Living people
Olympic tennis players of the Netherlands
Sportspeople from Rotterdam
Tennis players at the 1988 Summer Olympics